WISM-FM (98.1 FM) is a radio station  broadcasting a classic hits format. Licensed to Altoona, Wisconsin, United States, the station serves the Eau Claire-Chippewa Falls area. It is owned by Mid-West Family Broadcasting.

History
The WISM FM callsign was first used in 1959 in Madison at 98.1 FM.  On December 1, 1983, WISM became changed its callsign to WMGN. 

Eventually, the Federal Communications Commission (FCC) controlled and licensed station call lettered were acquired by Alpenglow Communications, which relaunched WISM-FM in November 1991 with a classic rock format. 

The station was then bought by Clear Channel Broadcasting Licenses, Inc., but was then sold to Aloha Station Trust, LLC.

The station was sold again in 2016 to Mid-West Family Broadcasting for $970,000.

On July 1, 2016, coincident with the sale to Mid-West Family Broadcasting being consummated, WISM-FM changed its format from adult contemporary to classic hits, branded as "Greatest Hits 98.1".  The specific programming was transferred from WDRK, upon that station's donation from Mid-West Family Broadcasting to Blugold Radio LLC.

References

External links

ISM-FM
Classic hits radio stations in the United States
Radio stations established in 1991
1991 establishments in Wisconsin